The 1958–59 William & Mary Indians men's basketball team represented the College of William & Mary in intercollegiate basketball during the 1958–59 NCAA University Division men's basketball season. Under the second year of head coach Bill Chambers, the team finished the season 13–11 and 7–7 in the Southern Conference. William & Mary played its home games at Blow Gymnasium. This was the 54th season of the collegiate basketball program at William & Mary, whose nickname is now the Tribe.

The Indians finished in 4th place in the conference and qualified for the 1959 Southern Conference men's basketball tournament, held at the Richmond Arena. William & Mary defeated Richmond in the quarterfinals before losing in the semifinals to top-seeded West Virginia.

Program notes
William & Mary played two teams for the first time this season: Louisiana Tech and North Texas State.
Roy Lange was named, for the second consecutive year, to the first team all-Southern Conference, and Jeff Cohen was named to the second team.

Schedule

|-
!colspan=9 style="background:#006400; color:#FFD700;"| Regular season

|-
!colspan=9 style="background:#006400; color:#FFD700;"| 1959 Southern Conference Basketball Tournament

Source

References

William & Mary Tribe men's basketball seasons
William and Mary Indians
William and Mary Indians Men's Basketball Team
William and Mary Indians Men's Basketball Team